Point of Departure is a studio album by American jazz pianist and composer Andrew Hill, recorded in 1964 and released in 1965 on the Blue Note label. It features Hill in a sextet with alto saxophonist Eric Dolphy, tenor saxophonist Joe Henderson, trumpeter Kenny Dorham, bassist Richard Davis and drummer  Tony Williams.

Point of Departure was reissued on CD by Blue Note in 1988 and again in 1999 when recording engineer Rudy Van Gelder remastered the album, adding alternate takes of "New Monastery", "Flight 19", and "Dedication".

Reception

The AllMusic review by Thom Jurek calls the album "a stellar date, essential for any representative jazz collection, and a record that, in the 21st century, still points the way to the future for jazz". The Penguin Guide to Jazz gives the album a four-star rating plus a special "crown" accolade, and includes it as part of a selected "Core Collection." "Dedication" was originally titled "Cadaver" and wants to "express a feeling of great loss". The sad aura of the piece was such that, after playing a section of said piece, Dorham teared up a bit.

Track listing

Tracks 6, 7, 8 not part of original album

Personnel

Musicians
Kenny Dorham – trumpet
Eric Dolphy – alto saxophone (1, 2, 3), bass clarinet (3, 4, 5), flute (3)
Joe Henderson – tenor saxophone (all), flute (3)
Andrew Hill – piano
Richard Davis – double bass
Tony Williams – drums

Production
Alfred Lion – production
Rudy Van Gelder – recording engineering
Nat Hentoff – liner notes 
Reid Miles – photography, design

References

Blue Note Records albums
Albums produced by Alfred Lion
Andrew Hill albums
1965 albums
Albums recorded at Van Gelder Studio